Komgrich Nantapech, also better known as Eaktwan BTU Ruawaiking (เอกตะวัน บีทียูเรือไวกิ้ง) or Ektawan Mor Krungthep Thonburi (เอกตะวัน ม.กรุงเทพธนบุรี; born July 24, 1989), is a Thai professional boxer who challenged for the IBF flyweight title in 2017.

Career
He is a former Thai Flyweight champion and the current IBF Pan-Pacific flyweight champion, On April 29, 2017 Nantapech is the #4 IBF Flyweight, he challenge the #3  Donnie Nietes for the vacant IBF World Title vacated by then Champion Johnriel Casimero.

His current promoter and manager is Ekarat "Jimmy" Chaichotchuang of Kiat Kreerin Promotion.

His ring name "Eaktawan" (lit. Solitary Sun) comes from his manager Ekarat and his supporter Ekachai Leuang Sa-Ard, he is currently studying at the Faculty of Political Science, Bangkokthonburi University.

Professional boxing record 

{|class="wikitable" style="text-align:center; font-size:95%"
|-
!Result
!Record
!Opponent
!Type
!Round, time
!Date
!Location
!Notes
|- align=center
|Win||25–5||align=left| Rollen Del Castillo	
|
|
|
|align=left|
|align=left|
|- align=center
|Win||24–5||align=left| Crison Omayao	
|
|
|
|align=left|
|align=left|
|- align=center
|Win||23–5||align=left| Naoki Mochizuki
|
|
|
|align=left|
|align=left|
|- align=center
|Loss||22–5||align=left| Juan Carlos Reveco
|
|
|
|align=left|
|align=left|
|- align=center
|Loss||22–4||align=left| Donnie Nietes  
|
|
|
|align=left|
|align=left|. 
|- align=center
|Win||22–3||align=left| Jeny Boy Boca
|
|
|
|align=left|
|align=left|
|- align=center
|Win||21–3||align=left| Demsi Manufoe
|
|
|
|align=left|
|align=left|
|- align=center
|Win||20–3||align=left| Jayar Diama
|
|
|
|align=left|
|align=left|
|- align=center
|Win||19–3||align=left| Takayuki Okumoto
|
|
|
|align=left|
|align=left|
|- align=center
|Win||18–3||align=left| Yang Chen
|
|
|
|align=left|
|align=left|
|- align=center
|Win||17–3||align=left| Jomar Fajardo
|
|
|
|align=left|
|align=left|
|- align=center
|Win||16–3||align=left| Frans Damur Palue
|
|
|
|align=left|
|align=left|
|- align=center
|Win||15–3||align=left| Lionel Legada
|
|
|
|align=left|
|align=left|
|- align=center
|Win||14–3||align=left| Ardi Tefa
|
|
|
|align=left|
|align=left|
|- align=center
|Win||13–3||align=left| Ical Tobida
|
|
|
|align=left|
|align=left|
|- align=center
|Win||12–3||align=left| Edison Berwela
|
|
|
|align=left|
|align=left|
|- align=center
|Win||11–3||align=left| Gaspar Ampolo
|
|
|
|align=left|
|align=left|
|- align=center
|Win||10–3||align=left| Jemmy Gobel
|
|
|
|align=left|
|align=left|
|- align=center
|Win||9–3||align=left| Renz Llagas
|
|
|
|align=left|
|align=left|
|- align=center
|Win||8–3||align=left| Jimmy Masangkay
|
|
|
|align=left|
|align=left|
|- align=center
|Loss||7–3||align=left| Froilan Saludar
|
|
|
|align=left|
|align=left|
|- align=center
|Win||7–2||align=left| Velasak Samsee
|
|
|
|align=left|
|align=left|
|- align=center
|Win||6–2||align=left| Chamuakpetch Kor Kamolwat
|
|
|
|align=left|
|align=left|
|- align=center
|Loss||5–2||align=left| Sho Ishida
|
|
|
|align=left|
|align=left|
|- align=center
|Loss||5–1–0||align=left| Albert Pagara
|
|
|
|align=left|
|align=left|
|- align=center
|Win||5–0||align=left| Kong Sithsamart
|
|
|
|align=left|
|align=left|
|- align=center
|Win||4–0||align=left| Den Sithsaithong
|
|
|
|align=left|
|align=left|
|- align=center
|Win||3–0||align=left| Chartphichit Sor Rathidech
|
|
|
|align=left|
|align=left|
|- align=center
|Win||2–0||align=left| Khaosainoi Or Nanthasrinon
|
|
|
|align=left|
|align=left|
|- align=center
|Win||1–0||align=left| Tepparith Sor Thanmajak
|
|
| 
|align=left|
|align=left|

Title/s in boxing 
Regional/International Titles:
Thai Flyweight Champion (112 lbs)
IBF Pan-Pacific Flyweight Champion (112 lbs)

See also 
 List of IBF world champions
 List of flyweight boxing champions

References

External links 
 

Eaktwan BTU Ruaviking
1989 births
Living people
Flyweight boxers
Eaktwan BTU Ruaviking